The Americas Zone was one of three zones of regional competition in the 2003 Fed Cup.

Group I
Venue: Campinas, Brazil (outdoor clay) 
Date: 23–26 April

The eight teams were divided into two pools of four teams. The teams that finished first in the pools played-off against those that placed second to determine which team would partake in the World Group Play-offs. The two nations coming last in the pools were relegated to Group II for 2004.

Pools

Play-offs

  and  advanced to 2003 World Group Play-offs.

Group II
 Venue: San Juan, Puerto Rico (outdoor hard) 
 Date: 23–27 April

The ten teams were divided into two pools of five. The top team from each pool then advanced to Group I for 2004.

Pools

  and  advanced to Group I in 2003.

See also
Fed Cup structure

References

 Fed Cup Profile, Canada
 Fed Cup Profile, Mexico
 Fed Cup Profile, Uruguay
 Fed Cup Profile, Brazil
 Fed Cup Profile, El Salvador
 Fed Cup Profile, Cuba
 Fed Cup Profile, Puerto Rico
 Fed Cup Profile, Ecuador
 Fed Cup Profile, Venezuela
 Fed Cup Profile, Dominican Republic
 Fed Cup Profile, Chile
 Fed Cup Profile, Jamaica
 Fed Cup Profile, Bolivia
 Fed Cup Profile, Bermuda

External links
 Fed Cup website

 
Americas
Sport in Campinas
Tennis tournaments in Brazil
Sports in San Juan, Puerto Rico
Tennis tournaments in Puerto Rico
2003 in Puerto Rican sports